Independencia (Spanish for "independence") is a commune of Chile located in Santiago Province, Santiago Metropolitan Region. The main street is Independencia Avenue.

Demographics
The population fell by 15.8% (12315 persons) between the 1992 and 2002 censuses. The 2006 projected population was 57,886.

Stats
Average annual household income: $30,355 (PPP, 2006)
Population below poverty line: 6.0% (2006)
Regional quality of life index: 78.95, mid-high, 15 out of 52 (2005)
Human Development Index: 0.709, 111 out of 341 (2003)

Administration

As a commune, Independencia is a third-level administrative division of Chile administered by a municipal council, headed by an alcalde who is directly elected every four years. The 2012-2016 alcalde is Gonzalo Durán Baronti (PS). The communal council has the following members:
 Pilar Durán Baronti (PS)
 Rodrigo Barco Sánchez (RN)
 Carola Rivero Canales (PS)
 América López Moris (DC)
 Margarita Vásquez Contreras (UDI)
 Sandra Álvarez Ruíz (RN)
 Elena Salazar Bonta (PC)
 José Miguel Cuevas Fonsea (PS)

Within the electoral divisions of Chile, Independencia is represented in the Chamber of Deputies by Patricio Hales (PPD) and Claudia Nogueira (UDI) as part of the 19th electoral district, (together with Recoleta). The commune is represented in the Senate by Guido Girardi Lavín (PPD) and Jovino Novoa Vásquez (UDI) as part of the 7th senatorial constituency (Santiago-West).

References

External links
  Municipality of Independencia

Populated places in Santiago Province, Chile
Communes of Chile
Geography of Santiago, Chile
Populated places established in 1945
1945 establishments in Chile